Local elections were held in Sweden on Sunday 15 September 2002 to elect county councils and municipal councils. The elections were held alongside general elections.

Results

County council elections

Municipal elections

References

Local and municipal elections in Sweden
2002 elections in Sweden
September 2002 events in Europe